Peter I of Rosenberg (died 1347) was lord chamberlain of the Kingdom of Bohemia, who acted as regent during John of Bohemia's absences at war between 1339 and 1346. He was a patron of Vyšší Brod Monastery and is thought to have commissioned the Master of Vyšší Brod altarpiece. In 1316 he married Viola of Teschen, former queen consort (wife of king Wenceslaus III).

References

Bohemia
14th-century Bohemian people
Rosenberg family

1347 deaths
Year of birth unknown